The  Battle at Port-la-Joye  (also known as the Port-la-Joye Massacre) was a battle in King George's War that took place with British against French troops and Mi'kmaq militia on the banks of present-day Hillsborough River, Prince Edward Island in the summer of 1746. French officer Jean-Baptiste Nicolas Roch de Ramezay sent French and Mi'kmaq forces to Port-la-Joye where they surprised and defeated a force of 200 Massachusetts militia in two British naval vessels that were gathering provisions for recently captured Louisbourg.

Background 
After he first fall of louisbourg, British commander William Pepperrell sent an expedition against Ile Saint Jean in July 1755. This force divided, one part going to Three Rivers (present-day Georgetown/Brudenell), the other to Port-La-Joye. At Three Rivers, Acadian Jean Pierre Roma and others did not give any resistance because they only had one six pound cannon to mount a defence. Roma, along with his son and daughter escaped into the woods where they witnessed the New Englanders burn the village. The family then escaped to Saint Peters (PEI) and then went on to Quebec, remaining there until the end of the war.

At the same time, in July 1745, the other English detachment landed at Port-la-Joye. Under the command of Joseph de Pont Duvivier, the French had a garrison of 20 French troops (Compagnies Franches de la Marine) at Port-la-Joye. The troops fled and New Englanders burned the capital to the ground. Duvivier and the twenty men retreated up the Northeast River (Hillsborough River), pursued by the New Englanders until the French troops received reinforcements from the Acadian militia and the Mi'kmaq. The French troops and their allies were able to drive the New Englanders to their boats, nine New Englanders killed, wounded or made prisoner. The New Englanders took six Acadian hostages, who would be executed if the Acadians or Mi'kmaq rebelled against New England control. The New England troops left for Louisbourg. Duvivier and his 20 troops left for Quebec. After the fall of Louisbourg, the resident French population of Ile Royal were deported to France. The Acadians of Ile Saint-Jean lived under the threat of deportation for the remainder of the war.

The following year, in an effort to recapture Acadia, an expedition under the command of de Ramezay was sent from Quebec to work with the Duc d'Anville Expedition. De Ramezay's force arrived in Nova Scotia in July 1746. He had 700 soldiers and 21 officers. He made camp at Chignecto, where he was met by 300 Abenaki from St. John River and about 300 Mi'kmaq from Nova Scotia. The total French-Indian force numbered close to 1,300 men. De Ramezay's soldiers spent the summer and the fall waiting for the arrival of the long overdue D'Anville expedition. During this time period, Ramzay sent troops to British-occupied Port-La-Joye on present-day Prince Edward Island.

Battle 
Captain John Rous commanded the snow Shirley Galley (24 gun) and a schooner on a tender. On board the vessel was 40 soldiers of F.B. Fuller's 29th Regiment of Foot, including Captain Hugh Scott. The newly appointed British governor of the Isle Royal, Commodore Sir Charles Knowles, 1st Baronet sent Rous to get supplies from the Acadians to feed the British troops at Louisbourg.

Ramezay initially sent French officer Boishébert to Ile Saint-Jean on a reconnaissance to assess the size of the New England force. Boishébert learned there were two English naval vessels and 200 troops - the galley HMS Shirley and HMS Ruby (700 ton transport) - at Port-la-Joye boarding supplies for Louisburg. On board the vessels were at least two of the Acadian hostages taken by New Englanders the year before. After Boishébert returned, Ramezay sent Joseph-Michel Legardeur de Croisille et de Montesson along with over 500 men, 200 of whom were Mi'kmaq, to Port-La-Joye.

While the 29th regiment waited for the Acadians to release half of their cattle for the British at Louisbourg, the regiment was unarmed in the field on the banks of the Northeast River (Hillsborough River), close to Port-la-Joye, making hay. Their arms remained in a tent. On July 11, de Montesson caught the New England troops by surprise. The Acadian and Mi'kmaq force "massacred" 34 of the British troops (27 soldiers and 7 sailors). The British killed two Mi'kmaq and knocked out two others with a firelock. While the attack was happening, Captain Rous and Captain Scott were on the Shirley, which opened fire on the attackers, with little effect. The attacking party eventually retreated and Captain Scott took 40 Acadians prisoners and ransomed them to the commander of the Duc D'Anville Expedition.

On July 23, 1746, de Montesson returned to de Ramezay at Chignecto with two of the Acadian prisoners the New Englanders had taken previously, numerous English prisoners and the Acadian pilot.

Aftermath 
Months later Ramzey was unsuccessful in his attack on Annapolis Royal because of the failure of the Duc d'Anville Expedition to arrive at the capital. The following year Ramezay would have victory at the Battle of Grand Pré.

Montesson took the prisoners first to Baie-Verte and then Ramezay sent them under heavy guard to the prison camp at Québec, along with a commendation for Montesson for having distinguished himself in his first independent command.

The battle led to an order that all officers in the 29th Regiment must always be armed, thus earning their first nickname as the Ever Sworded due to the swords the officers are required to wear even when off-duty a tradition still in effect today as the orderly officer is still armed even at the officers mess.

See also 
 Military history of Nova Scotia
List of massacres in Canada

References

Sources
Harvey, Daniel C. The French régime in Prince Edward Island, Yale University Press. 1926.
Lockerby, Earle. "Threats and indulgences: Ile-Saint-Jean in 1745-1747." Island Magazine 54 (2003): 2-10.
 Major H. Everard, History of Thos. Farrington's Regiment, subsequently designated the 29th (Worcestershire) Foot, 1694 to 1891. Worcester, 1891. pp.46-47

External links
Roma at Trois Rivier
 
 
 
 

Military history of Acadia
Military history of Nova Scotia
Military history of New England
Port-la-Joye
Port-la-Joye
Military history of Prince Edward Island
Acadian history
Port-la-Joye
1746 in Canada
Port-la-Joye
Port-la-Joye
Massacres by First Nations